Barotiwala is a village in Dharampur Mandal in Solan District in Himachal Pradesh state, India.

Barotiwala is located 18.31 km distance from its Mandal Main Town Dharampur. Barotiwala is 25.36 km far from its District Main City, Solan. It is 84.3 km far from its State Main City Shimla.

Nearby villages are Mandhala (2.795 km), Thana (8.101 km), Kishanpura (11.86 km), Manpura (12.21 km), Kasauli Garkhal (12.93 km), Garkhal Sanawar (13.71 km), Taksal (13.76 km), Anji Matla, Badian, Banasar, Barotiwala, Bhaguri, Bughar Kanaitan, Chamian, Chamon, Ganol, Garkhal Sanawar, Gharsi, are the villages along with this village in the same Dharampur Mandal

Barotiwala Pin Code is 174103 and Post office name is. Other villages in Post Office (174103,) are Barotiwala, Mandhala. It is 32 km from Chandigarh
There is a university situated in Barotiwala named Chitkara University, Himachal Pradesh.

Notes

Villages in Solan district